Haliplus canadensis is a species of water beetle in the genus Haliplus. The species was described by Wallis in 1933.

References

Haliplidae
Beetles described in 1933